The Garland House is a historic building located in Dubuque, Iowa, United States.  Joseph C. Garland settled in Dubuque in 1889 and built a general insurance agency that grew to cover 25 counties in Iowa representing the Northwestern Mutual Life Insurance Company.  He was also a community booster and philanthropist.  The exterior of his large Georgian Revival home is covered with concrete block veneer, which is an unusual combination.  The main facade is dominated by a two-story pedimented portico, the east elevation by a centered semicircular vault dormer, and the rear elevation by a two-story veranda.  The house is capped with a hip roof with dormers.  It was individually listed on the National Register of Historic Places in 1983, and it was included as a contributing property in the Langworthy Historic District in 2004.

References

Houses completed in 1907
Georgian Revival architecture in Iowa
Houses in Dubuque, Iowa
National Register of Historic Places in Dubuque, Iowa
Houses on the National Register of Historic Places in Iowa
Individually listed contributing properties to historic districts on the National Register in Iowa